Sibu-Tanjung Manis Highway, Sarawak State Route Q743, is a major highway in Sibu Division, Sarawak, Malaysia. The highway was expected to be completed by the end of June 2010, and as of March 2011, the highway was accessible, although there were several sections still under construction.

List of interchanges

References

Roads in Sarawak
Highways in Malaysia